The Plaquemine culture was an archaeological culture (circa 1200 to 1700 CE) centered on the Lower Mississippi River valley. It had a deep history in the area stretching back through the earlier Coles Creek (700-1200 CE) and Troyville cultures (400-700 CE) to the Marksville culture (100 BCE to 400 CE). The Natchez and related Taensa peoples were their historic period descendants. The type site for the culture is the Medora site in Louisiana; while other examples include the Anna, Emerald, Holly Bluff, and Winterville sites in Mississippi.

History

Definition
The Plaquemine culture was a Mississippian culture variant centered on the Mississippi River valley, stretching from the Gulf of Mexico to just south of its junction with the Arkansas River, encompassing the Yazoo River basin and Natchez Bluffs in western Mississippi, and the lower Ouachita and Red River valleys in southeastern Arkansas, and eastern Louisiana. They were primarily agriculturists who grew maize, pumpkins, squash, beans and tobacco but they also hunted, fished, and gathered wild plants.

The Medora site in West Baton Rouge Parish, Louisiana is the type site for the period, defined by Dr. James A. Ford and George I. Quimby after excavations at the site in the late 1930s and early 1940s. The name for the culture is taken from the proximity of Medora to the nearby town of Plaquemine. It was inhabited from approximately 1300 to 1600 CE and it consisted of two platform mounds separated by a plaza. Pottery from the site was overwhelmingly grog-tempered with only a few bits of shell-tempered pottery being found. These cultural hallmarks along with the implementation of intensive maize agriculture have become Plaquemine culture designators.

Plaquemine was an outgrowth of the earlier Coles Creek culture (700 to 1200 CE). They experienced significant contact with Mississippian culture peoples to their north and east and the Terminal Coles Creek/early Plaquemine period was contemporaneous with the height of the Middle Mississippian culture at Cahokia in the American Bottom near St. Louis, Missouri. After Cahokia's collapse in the mid 14th century they coexisted with Late Mississippian groups centered on eastern Arkansas near Memphis. Archaeologists debate whether Plaquemine is a completely local development or if the changes in their society that led from Coles Creek to Plaquemine was a result of contact with their Mississippian neighbors. Many of these Coles Creek sites continued use by their Plaquemine descendants, and Plaquemine sites were still being used in the early 1700s during the early historic period.

The Plaquemine period saw the re-purposing and expansion of sites occupied during the Coles Creek period. Unlike Mississippian settlements which were often large nucleated villages, Plaquemine settlements were usually barely populated ceremonial civic centers whose only permanent residents were the elites and their families, priests, and their attendants and servants. Everyone else lived in small hamlets and farmsteads dispersed across the landscape. Coupled with the adoption of maize agriculture during this period was a population explosion and an increase in the number and size of the sites. The ethnographic record from the historic period suggests some large sites such as Winterville or Emerald were the centers of paramount chiefdoms who exerted control over other smaller civic sites. These second tier rulers, part of a hereditary nobility, would have been related matrilineally to the ruling paramount chief. An inherently volatile system, sometimes factions in smaller centers attained supremacy and power would shift from one civic center to another, resulting in the partial or total abandonment of the former capital.

Plaquemine Mississippian

Beginning during the Terminal Coles Creek period (1150 to 1250 CE), Mississippian cultures far upstream from the Plaquemine area began expanding their reach southward. Excavations in the Yazoo Basin area of Mississippi have shown a Cahokia Horizon as extra-regional exotic goods, such as Cahokian pottery and other artifacts, began to be deposited in Coles Creek-Plaquemine culture sites. Through repeated contacts, groups in Mississippi and then Louisiana began adopting Mississippian techniques for making pottery, as well as ceremonial objects and possibly social structuring.

By the mid 15th century influences from Pensacola culture peoples (from the Bottle Creek site on the Gulf Coast near Mobile) had begun spreading westward across Barataria Bay and the Atchafalaya Basin and by 1700 had Mississipianized the local populations as far north as modern day Baton Rouge, Louisiana. Use of grog tempering for pottery at locations such as the Sims site in southeastern Louisiana had been replaced by shell tempering.

The Plaquemine peoples absorbed more Mississippian influence and the area of their distinct culture began to shrink after 1350 CE. Eventually the last enclave of purely Plaquemine culture was the southern Natchez Bluffs area, while the Yazoo Basin and Louisiana areas became a hybrid Plaquemine Mississippian culture.

Protohistory

The earliest European account of the culture may be recorded in the journals of the Spanish expedition of Hernando de Soto. In 1542 de Soto's expedition encountered a powerful chiefdom located on the eastern bank of the Mississippi River. Native sources called it "Quigualtam", the name of the polity, its capital, and its paramount chief. By this point the expedition had been traversing the southeast for several years and accounts of their deplorable treatment of the indigenous populations would have been known by groups they had yet to contact in person. Their encounter with the polity was brief and violent; the natives attacked and chased the Spaniards with their canoes. When the remnants of de Sotos expedition finally made it down the river past Quigualtam they encountered below it another unnamed but powerful chiefdom; who also gave chase until the foreigners had left their territory.

Various scholars have debated the identities of these two groups and their exact locations. Historian Charles M. Hudson has suggested that Quigualtam was centered on the area surrounding the Holly Bluff or Winterville sites in the lower Yazoo Basin. The sites themselves are thought by archaeologists to have been abandoned by this point but the power center of the polity had probably shifted to another site within its territory. A possibility for the second group is the Emerald Phase (1500 – 1680) of the Natchez chiefdom, headquartered at the massive Emerald Mound; which was in its ascendancy at the time. These two sites were the only major ceremonial center on this stretch of the Mississippi River occupied during the protohistoric period from 1500 to 1650 CE. Since the Spaniards never made it ashore to leave archaeological evidence of contact with these two groups their exact identity will probably never be determined with certainty. No further recorded European contact with the indigenous people in this area occurred for almost 140 years when the first French explorers arrived in the area. By the historic period, power had shifted within the Natchez polity from Emerald Mound to the Grand Village of the Natchez.

In the meantime native peoples of the region suffered from epidemics of infectious disease; carried both by the de Soto expedition and indirectly from other Native Americans who had contact with European traders on the Gulf coast. On top of this the intrusion of Europeans had upset the delicate political balance between native groups who had existed in a state of endemic warfare between polities for generations. Many societies in the region began to collapse. Remnant populations of Mississippian peoples began migrating across and down the Mississippi. The post de Soto entrada Transylvania Phase (1550-1700 CE) of the Tensas Basin saw the increasing spread of Mississippian influences diffusing southward from Arkansas and northwestern Mississippi into traditional Plaquemine territory. The Jordan Mounds site on a relict channel of the Arkansas River in northeastern Louisianas Morehouse Parish was constructed during the protohistoric period between 1540 and 1685. The builders were an intrusive group in the area; Mississippianized peoples who were possibly refugees from the Mississippi River area to the east that were escaping the collapse of their societies brought about by the aftereffects of first European contact. Others, such as the multiple Mississippian Tunica speaking polities encountered by de Soto in Arkansas and northwestern Mississippi had all but vanished; with a few small groups like the Tunica and Koroa relocating to former Plaquemine territory at the mouth of the Yazoo River in west central Mississippi. The Central Mississippi Valley which de Soto had described as the most heavily populated area he had seen since the Valley of Mexico was now almost vacant; only sparsely occupied by the Quapaw who were an intrusive Dhegiha Siouan people that moved into the area from the Ohio River region sometime in the late 16th to early 17th century.

Historic era

Now surrounded on all sides by Mississippians, several Plaquemine groups persisted into the historic era in the Natchez Bluffs area. Cultural trappings including societal organization, language and pottery styles in Louisiana and Mississippi during the early historic period bear this out. Possibly because their encounter with de Soto had been so brief compared to the more northerly populations, the Plaquemine Natchez people and Taensa peoples alone maintained the characteristics of complex chiefdoms such as hereditary elites, mound ceremonialism, and retainer sacrifice long into the period after the European colonization of America began. They were the last Plaquemine culture peoples. Groups who were intrusive to the area or local groups who had been Mississippianized are identified at the time of sustained European contact as those tribes speaking the Tunican, Chitimachan, and Muskogean languages.

Culture

Architecture
They had complex political and religious institutions and lived in villages centered on large ceremonial centers with two or more platform mounds facing an open plaza. The site of a mound was usually one with special significance, either a pre-existing mortuary site, temple, or civic structure. The flat-topped, pyramidal mounds usually underwent multiple episodes of mound construction and were built in several stages. Sometimes they were topped by one or more smaller mounds secondary mounds. After each expansion episode new structures were usually constructed on their summits. In earlier times, buildings were usually circular, but later they were likely to be rectangular. They were constructed of wattle and daub, and sometimes with wall posts sunk into wall trenches. At times, shallow, oval or rectangular graves were dug in the mounds. These might have been for primary burials, but more often they were for the reburial of remains originally interred in mortuary houses.

This pattern of plazas flanked by mounds with temples, elite residences and mortuary structures at their summits was inherited from their Troyville and Coles Creek culture ancestors, and was a village arrangement widely employed throughout the southeast. Like other Native Americans in the southeast this open plaza area would have been used for public rituals and functions such as the Green Corn Ceremony and games such as chunkey and the ballgame.

Ceramics

Plaquemine pottery was decorated with their own unique characteristics. They sometimes added small solid handles called lugs and textured the surface by brushing clumps of grass over the vessel before it was fired. Potters cut designs into the surface of the wet clay and, like their Caddoan contemporaries, the Plaquemine peoples engraved designs on pots after they were fired. Plaquemine peoples also had undecorated pots that they used for ordinary daily tasks. Pottery was included in burials as grave goods, often being ritually "killed". This type has a hole in the base of the vessel that was cut while the pot was being made, usually before it was fired.

Pottery during this phase still used grog tempering as their Coles Creek ancestors had; with the use of ground mussel shell tempering being a distinctive marker for Mississippian cultural contact. Pottery from protohistoric Natchez sites in western Mississippi still used the traditional Plaquemine grog tempering and traditional vessel forms. The pottery of the Taensa in eastern Louisiana used Mississippian style shell tempering and pottery shapes but was still being engraved with decorative designs typical of the Plaquemine area. This difference between the two closely related groups showed that Mississippian diffusion into the area beginning during the Transylvania Phase (1550-1700 CE) of the Tensas Basin region from what is now southeastern Arkansas had by the late 17th century reached the lower Tensas River basin in Louisiana.

Chronology

Sites

See also
 Mississippian culture
 Culture, phase, and chronological table for the Mississippi Valley

References

 Hudson, Charles M., Knights of Spain, Warriors of the Sun: Hernando De Soto and the South's Ancient Chiefdoms,   University of Georgia Press, 1997. 
 R. Barry Lewis and Charles Stout, editors., "Mississippian Towns and Sacred Spaces", University of Alabama Press, 1998. 
 Jeffrey P. Brain, "Winterville-Late Prehistoric Culture Contact in the Lower Mississippi Valley",Mississippi Department of Archives and History, 1989.
 Mark A. Rees and Patrick C. Livingood, editors., "Plaquemine Archaeology", University of Alabama Press, 2006.

External links

 Plaquemine Mississippian

 
Archaeological cultures of North America
Pyramids in the United States